Kalaleh (also Romanized as Kalāleh and Kalālah) is a city in Golestan Province, in northern Iran.  At the 2011 census, its population was 110,473, in 6,446 families.

References

Populated places in Kalaleh County

Cities in Golestan Province